INS Trata is a missile battery base of the Indian Navy at Mumbai, Maharashtra tasked with the coastal defense of Maharashtra and Gujarat.

History 
The word Trata in Sanskrit means ‘The Protector’. The unit was commissioned on 12 December 1964 when the Indian Navy took over the coastal battery at Colaba point, from the army, which is presently INS Kunjali. The then Chief of Naval Staff, Vice Admiral BS Soman commissioned it as INS Trata. On 26 Aug 1988 the Navy’s MMCB squadron was inducted. It was placed under the command of the Commanding Officer, INS Trata, when it shifted to Worli in August 1992.

Objective 
The role of INS Trata is to defend the Indian naval bases and shipping against enemy ship attacks. The Mobile Missile Coastal Battery (MMCB) Squadron is unique in the Indian Navy in the sense that it is an operational Missile Squadron that is intended to provide Missile Coverage & Coastal defense to the Coast of Gujarat and Maharashtra and is also a shore establishment.

See also 
 Indian navy 
 List of Indian Navy bases
 List of active Indian Navy ships

 Integrated commands and units
 Armed Forces Special Operations Division
 Defence Cyber Agency
 Integrated Defence Staff
 Integrated Space Cell
 Indian Nuclear Command Authority
 Indian Armed Forces
 Special Forces of India

 Other lists
 Strategic Forces Command
 List of Indian Air Force stations
 List of Indian Navy bases
 India's overseas military bases

References 

Trata
Buildings and structures in Mumbai